Pabstiella tripterantha is a species of orchid plant native to Bolivia.

References 

tripterantha
Flora of Bolivia